Newquay Zoo is a zoological garden located within Trenance Leisure Park in Newquay, England. The zoo was opened in Cornwall on Whit Monday, 26 May 1969 by the local council (Newquay Urban District Council, later Restormel District Council). It was privately owned by Mike Thomas and Roger Martin from 1993 until 2003. In August 2003 Stewart Muir became the new Director and the zoo became part of the Whitley Wildlife Conservation Trust, alongside Paignton Zoo and Living Coasts. The zoo is part of a registered charity, and was awarded various South West and Cornwall 'Visitor Attraction of The Year' and 'Sustainable Tourism' awards for excellence in 2006, 2007 and 2008. Newquay Zoo is now run as part of the Wild Planet Trust, the new name for the Whitley Wildlife Conservation Trust.

Cooperative links and awards 
The zoo has been recognised for providing sustainable tourism and was one of the first few British zoos to gain an ISO 14001 certificate for its environmental management systems along with a recent Gold award for GTBS Green Tourism Business Scheme. The zoo works within the BIAZA and EAZA zoo networks in Britain and Europe but has other ex-situ conservation links overseas.

A recent Cornwall Sustainable Tourism award and BIAZA award for sustainability projects recognised an interactive map of Newquay promoting self-guided walking tours around the town and Newquay area, featuring its history, heritage, wildlife and public transport links.

The Zoo today 
An expansion of  opened as an African Savanna area from Easter 2009 followed by a central new Philippines area housing endangered fishing cat, Visayan warty pig and Philippine spotted deer.

Animals 
The animal collection at Newquay consists of many species, including ex-situ conservation breeding programmes for endangered red pandas, lemurs, Humboldt penguins, marmosets, tamarins and tapirs.

The zoo is home to part of an international breeding programme for some endangered species such as Owston's palm civets for which an overseas in-situ conservation support programme of funding and skills exchange exists, along with support for the unau sloth project and pacarana in South America, pangolin and small carnivore conservation programme in Southeast Asia. The World Land Trust BIAZA zoo reserve in South America is also supported through the wild spaces scheme.

The EAZA campaign is supported annually. Recent overseas project information can be found for each project on the zoo website.  Increasingly animal species held at the zoo are listed as threatened or endangered species on the Red Data lists produced by the IUCN.

Mammals
Asian small-clawed otter
Azara's agouti
Black-and-white ruffed lemur
Black wildebeest
Brazilian guinea pig
Capybara
Carpathian lynx
Chapman's zebra
Colombian white-faced capuchin
Coppery titi
Crowned lemur
Dusky pademelon
Fishing cat
Goeldi's marmoset
Gray slender loris
Hoffmann's two-toed sloth
Long-nosed potoroo
Meerkat
Nyala
Owston's palm civet
Parma wallaby
Prevost's squirrel
Pygmy marmoset
Red panda
Ring-tailed lemur
Silvery marmoset
Six-banded armadillo
South American tapir
Swinhoe's striped squirrel
Visayan spotted deer
Visayan warty pig
Yellow mongoose

Birds
Asian fairy-bluebird
Black-necked swan
Blue-crowned hanging parrot
Blue-crowned laughingthrush
Great white pelican
Greater vasa parrot
Grosbeak starling
Humboldt penguin
Indian peafowl
Javan green magpie
Lilacine amazon
Luzon bleeding-heart
Papuan hornbill
Pink-headed fruit dove
Scarlet macaw
Snowy owl
Sumatran laughingthrush

Herps
Amazon milk frog
Black tree monitor
Electric blue gecko
Fiji banded iguana
Panther chameleon
Radiated tortoise
Red-tailed racer

Invertebrates
Curlyhair tarantula

Developments since 2009 
An additional paddock enclosure area of several acres (formerly a disused school playing field) was added to form the African Savanna area for African hoofstock.

This small 2009 expansion created the opportunity to reuse the old mixed African Plains exhibit, redeveloped into an enclosure for endangered Philippine endemic island animals such as Philippine spotted deer and Visayan warty pigs along with fishing cats.

In 2016 a new walkthrough aviary Gems of the Jungle was created for endangered Southeast Asian song birds. This new aviary replaced a former 1969 cat house turned aviary and the role of the now demolished 1969 Walkthrough Aviary, modelled on the Snowden Aviary at London Zoo.

Other interesting features 
Animal encounters and feeding time talks are also available throughout the year. A Tarzan Trail activity adventure trail, and Children's Play Areas. It used to have a Dragon Maze (hedge maze designed by mazemaker Adrian Fisher in 1983) are provided for children's entertainment.

Cooperative projects 
Newquay Zoo works with other organisations on events and educational projects such as the Charles Darwin bicentenary year events in 2009. It partnered Falmouth Art Gallery in hosting Cornish artists including John Dyer to produce material for four 2009 exhibitions at Falmouth, the port where Charles Darwin left  at the end of his voyage in 1836.

Some material was lent from the growing Newquay Zoo Archive of zoo historical material for these exhibitions and displays at Falmouth and Newquay Zoo.

Education projects 
Since 2000 Newquay Zoo has provided teaching input and practical opportunities for FE and HE students enrolled at the adjacent Newquay Centre for Applied Zoology Cornwall College Newquay on zoological conservation, education and media courses. The campus is based next to Newquay Zoo. This unusual and innovative partnership project was recognised by a BIAZA zoo education award in 2003 and 2016.

References

External links 

 Official site
 Whitley Wildlife Conservation Trust Website
 Newquay Zoo History and Archive Website
 Timeline
 Cornwall College Newquay zoo partnership courses
 Wild Planet Trust Website

Newquay
Zoos in England
Organisations based in Cornwall
Tourist attractions in Cornwall
Buildings and structures in Cornwall
Charities based in Cornwall
Zoos established in 1969
1969 establishments in England